Sceloporus utiformis,  Cope's largescale spiny lizard, is a species of lizard in the family Phrynosomatidae. It is endemic to Mexico.

References

Sceloporus
Reptiles of Mexico
Reptiles described in 1864
Taxa named by Edward Drinker Cope